The second season of the NBC comedy-drama series Parenthood premiered on September 14, 2010 and ended on April 19, 2011, it consisted of 22 episodes.

Cast

Main cast
 Peter Krause as Adam Braverman
 Lauren Graham as Sarah Braverman
 Dax Shepard as Crosby Braverman
 Monica Potter as Kristina Braverman
 Erika Christensen as Julia Braverman-Graham
 Sam Jaeger as Joel Graham
 Savannah Paige Rae as Sydney Graham (21 episodes)
 Sarah Ramos as Haddie Braverman (21 episodes)
 Max Burkholder as Max Braverman (21 episodes)
 Joy Bryant as Jasmine Trussell (21 episodes)
 Tyree Brown as Jabbar Trussell (16 episodes)
 Miles Heizer as Drew Holt (17 episodes)
 Mae Whitman as Amber Holt (21 episodes)
 Bonnie Bedelia as Camille Braverman (19 episodes)
 Craig T. Nelson as Zeek Braverman

Recurring cast
 Minka Kelly as Gaby
 Phil Abrams as Phil Lessing
 Amanda Foreman as Suze Lessing
 Tina Lifford as Renee Trussell
 Michael B. Jordan as Alex
 John Corbett as Seth Holt
 William Baldwin as Gordon Flint
 Anthony Carrigan as Cory Smith
 Scott Michael Foster as Gary
 Richard Dreyfuss as Gilliam T. Blount
 Zosia Mamet as Kelsey
 Kevin Alejandro as Mike (aka "Forklift Mike")

Production
On April 20, 2010 Parenthood was renewed for a second season by NBC. The second season premiered on Tuesday, September 14, 2010. It was announced on November 15, 2010 that Parenthood would be moving to Mondays at 10/9c beginning March 7. However, due to an overhaul of NBC's Law & Order: Los Angeles leading to an indefinite hiatus, the network announced on January 18, 2011 that Parenthood would remain in the Tuesday at 10/9c time slot.

Episodes

Ratings

U.S. Live Ratings

References

2010 American television seasons
2011 American television seasons
Season 2